A series of South African municipal by-elections was held in 2008 for ward seats on local municipal councils throughout the country. These by-elections were held to replace deceased, resigned or incapacitated councillors.

January
Two seats in one province were up for election on 23 January.

KwaZulu-Natal
 KZN266 - Ulundi [Ulundi] 52606021 JAPHET MZUKWANE KHANYILE INKATHA FREEDOM PARTY N/A 2699 0  N/A 0 N/A 
 KZN283 - Ntambana [Ntambana] 52803004 ZENZELENI JOSIAS BIYELA INKATHA FREEDOM PARTY

February
Two seats in one province were up for election on 13 February.

Mpumalanga
 MP321 - Thaba Chweu [Sabie] 83201003 PETER JABULANI MAHLANGU AFRICAN NATIONAL CONGRESS 
 MP325 - Bushbuckridge [Bushbuckridge] 83205003 CHARLES PROGRESS MONARENG AFRICAN NATIONAL CONGRESS

5 March
One seat in one province was up for election on 5 March.

KwaZulu-Natal
 KZN213 - Umzumbe [Umzumbe] 52103007 THEMBELA LAWRENCE PETERS AFRICAN NATIONAL CONGRESS

19 March
Five seats in one province were up for election on 19 March.

Western Cape
 WC024 - Stellenbosch [Stellenbosch] 10204017 MARTHA ELIZABETH LINDERS Independent 69.45% 3165 1399 44.2% 21 1.5% 
 Western Cape WC053 - Beaufort West [Beaufort West] 10503003 ALIDA CATHERINE ROSY MADUMBO INDEPENDENT CIVIC ORGANISATION OF SOUTH AFRICA 62.97% 3038 1335 43.94% 9 0.67% 
 Western Cape WC053 - Beaufort West [Beaufort West] 10503005 ANNA MAANS INDEPENDENT CIVIC ORGANISATION OF SOUTH AFRICA 46.86% 2634 1144 43.43% 13 1.14% 
 Western Cape WC053 - Beaufort West [Beaufort West] 10503006 ALOMA DANIELS INDEPENDENT CIVIC ORGANISATION OF SOUTH AFRICA 72.07% 2831 1393 49.21% 11 0.79% 
 Western Cape CPT - City of Cape Town [Cape Town] 19100015 JOHN AREND HEUVEL INDEPENDENT DEMOCRATS

April
Five seats in three provinces were up for election on 2 April.

Eastern Cape
 EC156 - Mhlontlo [Qumbu] 21506016 LUXOLO MANENTSA AFRICAN NATIONAL CONGRESS N/A 4124 0  N/A 0 N/A

Free State
 Free State FS184 - Matjhabeng [Welkom] 41804036 ANDRÉ STYGER DEMOCRATIC ALLIANCE/DEMOKRATIESE ALLIANSIE 68.85% 6087 2134 35.06% 12 0.56% 
 Free State FS203 - Ngwathe [Parys] 42003011 JABULANE ANDREW HLATSHWAYO PAN AFRICANIST CONGRESS OF AZANIA 88% 2974 257 8.64% 7 2.72%

KwaZulu-Natal
 KwaZulu-Natal KZN282 - uMhlathuze [Richards Bay] 52802024 RAYMOND ZAMA NKWANYANA AFRICAN NATIONAL CONGRESS 70.37% 4015 1650 41.1% 23 1.39% 
 KwaZulu-Natal ETH - eThekwini [Durban Metro] 59200026 BRIDGET NTSHANGASE AFRICAN NATIONAL CONGRESS

7 May
On 7 May, Vusumuzi Moses Ncube of the IFP was elected as councillor for Ward 3 in Mtubatuba (Mtubatuba) – KZ275.

21 May
11 seats in 6 provinces were up for election on 21 May.

Western Cape
 WC044 - George [George] LIONEL BERTRAM CHARLES ESAU DEMOCRATIC ALLIANCE/DEMOKRATIESE ALLIANSIE
 WC044 - George [George] BAZIL PETRUS INDEPENDENT DEMOCRATS

Eastern Cape
 EC122 - Mnquma [Butterworth] VICTOR MXOLI QWABE AFRICAN NATIONAL CONGRESS

Northern Cape
 NC061 - RICHTERSVELD [Port Nolloth] ELMINA NOMTSHATO HAUSIKU AFRICAN NATIONAL CONGRESS 
 NC073 - EMTHANJENI [De Aar] ELIJAH GIDEON HENDRICKS AFRICAN NATIONAL CONGRESS
 NC082 - KAI !GARIB [Keimoes] JOHANNA JUANITA TITUS AFRICAN NATIONAL CONGRESS 
 NC083 - KHARA HAIS [Upington] PIET JAKOBUS BRANDT AFRICAN NATIONAL CONGRESS 
 NC091 - Sol Plaatje [Kimberley] PETRUS JOHANNES FRANCOIS LOUW DEMOCRATIC ALLIANCE/DEMOKRATIESE ALLIANSIE

KwaZulu-Natal
 KZN435 - Umzimkhulu [Umzimkulu] ACCADIUS MTHOKOZISI ZULU AFRICAN NATIONAL CONGRESS  
 ETH - eThekwini [Durban Metro] ANANDAN NAIDOO MINORITY FRONT

North West
 NW384 - Ditsobotla [Lichtenburg] 63804005 ANDRÉ BEHM DEMOCRATIC ALLIANCE/DEMOKRATIESE ALLIANSIE

Gauteng
 Gauteng GT421 - Emfuleni [Vereeniging] 74201016 SUSANNA HENDRINA DE WEERD DEMOCRATIC ALLIANCE

July
On 15 July, a municipal by-election was held in five provinces.

Eastern Cape 
Two wards were contested:
In Ward 26 in Qaukeni Municipality [Flagstaff (Ingquza Hill)] – EC153 Sizakele Theophilus Hlongwane of the ANC is the new councillor, while Dean Neville Biddulph of the DA is the new councillor in Ward two in Nelson Mandela Bay Municipality (Port Elizabeth) – NMA.

Gauteng
Ward 55 in Tshwane Metro (Pretoria) – City of Tshwane Metropolitan Municipality (TSH) was won by Suzette Fourie of the DA.

KwaZulu-Natal
Ten by-elections were scheduled to take place in KwaZulu-Natal of which only nine took place. The Natal High Court interdicted the holding of the by-election in Ward four in eMadlangeni (Utrecht) – KZN253 on 15 July. The interdict was issued pending the outcome of a Court Application by M. E. Khoza involving the decision by the Executive Council of KwaZulu-Natal to remove him from office as a councillor of the eMadlangeni Municipal Council. Of the nine, eight were won by the IFP and one by the DA.

The new councillor for DA is Anton Michael Raubenheimer in Ward three in Endumeni Local Municipality (Dundee) – KZN241. This ward was previously held by the IFP. The new councillors for the IFP in KwaZulu-Natal are:

 Zwelinjani Henry Magubane in Ward nine in Msunduzi Municipality (Pietermaritzburg) – KZN225
 Themba Amos Radebe in Ward one in Okhahlamba Municipality (Bergville) – KZN235
 Andrias Gcinokwakhe Nhlangothi in Ward five in Okhahlamba Municipality (Bergville) – KZN235
 Samson Mfaniseni Khumalo in Ward eight in Okhahlamba Municipality (Bergville) – KZN235
 Nengani Gladys Buthelezi in Ward 11 in Okhahlamba Municipality (Bergville) – KZN235
 Thamsanqa Maxwell Nzuze in Ward nine in Newcastle Municipality (Newcastle) – KZN252
 Emmanuel Nkosinathi Buthelezi in Ward four in UPhongolo Municipality (Pongola) – KZN262
 Bhekinkosi Edwell Mhlongo in Ward five in Mthonjaneni Municipality (Melmoth) – KZN285

Northern Cape
Ward two in Moshaweng Municipality (Kgalagadi) – NC451 was won by Kebonye Gladys Gasehete of the African National Congress.

Western Cape
Ward 103 in City of Cape Town (Cape Town) – CPT was won by Johannes Frederik Hermanus van der Merwe of the DA.

September
Four seats in four provinces were up for election on 10 September:

Free State
 FS173 - Mantsopa [Ladybrand] MALIMABE PIET NAKALEBE AFRICAN NATIONAL CONGRESS

Gauteng
 GT483 - Westonaria [Westonaria] SANELE NGWEVENTSHA AFRICAN NATIONAL CONGRESS

KwaZulu-Natal
 KZN226 - Mkhambathini [Camperdown] SAZISO WANDA AFRICAN NATIONAL CONGRESS

Limpopo
 LIM332 - Greater Letaba [Duiwelskloof] ULANDA MOKGADI PHEEHA AFRICAN NATIONAL CONGRESS

15 October
9 seats in 4 provinces were up for election on 15 October.

Free State
 FS184 - Matjhabeng [Welkom] MIKIE ELIZABETH PHETISE (ANC)

Gauteng
 EKU - Ekurhuleni [East Rand] SHADI JULIA MASHININI AFRICAN NATIONAL CONGRESS
 JHB - City of Johannesburg [Johannesburg] MMAMADISE CHRISTINA MADISE AFRICAN NATIONAL CONGRESS

KwaZulu-Natal
 ETH - eThekwini [Durban Metro] Gabriel Cele AFRICAN NATIONAL CONGRESS 
 KZN236 - Imbabazane [Loskop] BONGANI PATRICK NDLOVU INKATHA FREEDOM PARTY
 KZN236 - Imbabazane [Loskop] Maxwell Mvelaze INKATHA FREEDOM PARTY 
 KZN236 - Imbabazane [Loskop] MBUZELENI CYRIL MKHIZE INKATHA FREEDOM PARTY 
 KZN263 - Abaqulusi [Vryheid] SYDNEY MANDLA VILAKAZI INKATHA FREEDOM PARTY

Mpumalanga
 MP302 - Msukaligwa [Ermelo] BONGINKOSI COLLEN SIBEKO AFRICAN NATIONAL CONGRESS

29 October
Three seats in two provinces were up for election on 29 October:

Eastern Cape
 EC128 - Nxuba [Adelaide] ELLIOT MAKHWENKWE MNQAMISA AFRICAN NATIONAL CONGRESS
 EC154 - Port St Johns [Port St Johns] WISEMAN VUYEKILE JIJIMBA AFRICAN NATIONAL CONGRESS

Western Cape
 WC041 - Kannaland [Ladismith] JEFFREY DONSON INDEPENDENT CIVIC ORGANISATION OF SOUTH AFRICA

December
On 10 December, a by-election was held in 41 local municipality seats in 5 provinces.

By province

Free State
two by-elections took place and both wards were won by the African National Congress:
 Simphiwe Louis Phokwana in Ward 17 in Matjhabeng (Welkom) FS184, and
 Petrus Monyatso Moloedi in Ward 2 in Nketoana (Reitz) FS193

Gauteng
three by-elections took place. 
 Pieter Eksteen van der Watt of the Democratic Alliance won Ward 4 in Nokeng Tsa Taemane (Cullinan)
 Rabatho John Mokotla (ANC) won in Ward 2 in Mogale City (Krugersdorp) GT481
 Joseph Maramane Mogotsi (ANC) in Ward 22 in Tshwane Metro (Pretoria) TSH.

KwaZulu-Natal
eight by-elections took place in KwaZulu-Natal. The new councillors for the African National Congress are:
 Sithembiso Gumede in Ward 56 in eThekwini (Durban) ETH
 Rommell Winston Jackson in Ward 1 in Mpofana (Mooirivier) KZN223, and
 Malandela Lincoln Mlotshwa in Ward 20 in Emnambithi-Ladysmith (Ladysmith) KZN232
 Lauren Anne de Scally of the Democratic Alliance won in Ward 2 in Umngeni (Howick) KZN222

The Inkatha Freedom Party has four new councillors in KwaZulu-Natal. They are:
 Jeon Zakhe Mabuyakhulu in Ward 16 in Nongoma (Nongoma) KZN265. This ward was uncontested
 Vukani Patrick Langa in Ward 24 in Ulundi (Ulundi) KZN266
 Zethu Betty Ngobe in Ward 12 in Jozini (Mkuze) KZN272
 Zwelithini Sedrick Gumede in Ward 8 in Mandeni (Mandeni) KZN291

Northern Cape
Ward 5 in Dikgatlong (Barkly West) was won by Naledi Georginah Molete of the African National Congress.

Western Cape
27 seats were contested in Western Cape province.

Cape Town
Of the eight wards contested in the City of Cape Town (Cape Town), two went to the Democratic Alliance and six went to independent candidates. They are:
 Monwabisi Godfrey Mbaliswana in Ward 33
 Glenville Bongani Mini in Ward 34
 Boyisile Mafilika in Ward 35
 Xolile Owen Gophe in Ward 52
 Nomamfene Theresa Bottoman in Ward 87, and
 Mzwandile Petterson Matiwane in Ward 88

The new councillors for the Democratic Alliance are –
 Faiza Adams in Ward 45; and
 Natalie Lorraine Bent in Ward 75

Rest of province
In the rest of the province, the new councillors are:
For the African National Congress
 Curnell Nelie Barends in Ward 5 in Breede Valley (Worcester) WC025
 Nceba Sindiliba Ndyalvan in Ward 17 in Breede Valley (Worcester) WC025, and
 Nontembiso Ellen Mpokotye in Ward 10 in Breede River/Winelands (Robertson) WC026

For the Democratic Alliance:
 Judith Mouton in Ward 2 in Cederberg (Citrusdal) WC012
 Koos Brandt in Ward 4 in Cederberg (Citrusdal) WC012
 Quintin Groenewald in Ward 5 in Cederberg (Citrusdal) WC012
 Joyce Ann Kroutz in Ward 26 in Drakenstein (Paarl) WC023
 Frans Albertus Kellerman in Ward 28 in Drakenstein (Paarl) WC023
 Kiro Jacobie Tiemie in Ward 1 in Theewaterskloof (Caledon) WC031
 Samuel Fredericks in Ward 9 in Theewaterskloof (Caledon) WC031

For the Independent Democrats:
 Delina Susan Goedeman in Ward 2 in Matzikama (Vrededal) WC011
 Benjamin van Rooy in Ward 3 in Cederberg (Citrusdal) WC012
 Ruth Belldine Arnolds in Ward 7 in Drakenstein (Paarl) WC023
 Gerald John Witbooi in Ward 30 in Drakenstein (Paarl) WC023
 James Johannes Jacobus Pheiffer in Ward 7 in Theewaterskloof (Caledon) WC031

The following councillors are independent councillors:
 Raynold Mathew van Rooy in Ward 4 in Bergrivier (Velddrif) WC013
 Spasie Nontuthuzelo Kika in Ward 21 in Drakenstein (Paarl) WC023
 Freddie Speelman in Ward 3 in Breede Valley (Worcester) WC025
 Philip Tyira in Ward 16 in Breede Valley (Worcester) WC025

Controversy

ANC barring from ward elections
The ANC was barred from fielding candidates in 12 of the 27 seats up for election in Western Cape by the IEC, a decision that was contested by the ANC.

Participation of COPE
The newly formed COPE party did not field candidates due to it not being formally constituted and registered with the Independent Electoral Commission in time. However, all ten independent councillors who won seats in the Western Cape were also members of the COPE party, and the by-election was seen as the first electoral test for the party.

2008
2008 elections in South Africa